This article presents a list of the historical events and publications of Australian literature during 1879.

Books 

 Ada Cambridge
 Dinah
 In Two Years Time
 John Boyle O'Reilly – Moondyne
 Catherine Helen Spence – Handfasted

Poetry 

 Adam Lindsay Gordon
 Poems of the Late Adam Lindsay Gordon
 "To My Sister"
 Henry Kendall
 "Araluen"
 "Hy-Brasil"
 "On a Street"
 "Orara"
 "The Sydney International Exhibition"

Non-fiction 

 Ned Kelly – The Jerilderie Letter

Births 

A list, ordered by date of birth (and, if the date is either unspecified or repeated, ordered alphabetically by surname) of births in 1879 of Australian literary figures, authors of written works or literature-related individuals follows, including year of death.

 22 February – Norman Lindsay, novelist and artist (died 1969)
 14 October – Miles Franklin, novelist (died 1954)

Deaths 

A list, ordered by date of death (and, if the date is either unspecified or repeated, ordered alphabetically by surname) of deaths in 1879 of Australian literary figures, authors of written works or literature-related individuals follows, including year of birth.

 6 January – Ellen Davitt, crime novelist (born 1812)

See also 
 1879 in poetry
 List of years in literature
 List of years in Australian literature
 1879 in literature
 1878 in Australian literature
 1879 in Australia
 1880 in Australian literature

References

Literature
Australian literature by year
19th-century Australian literature
1879 in literature